Events in the year 2017 in Monaco.

Incumbents 
 Monarch: Albert II
 Minister of State (Monaco): Serge Telle

Events 

 19–22 January – The 2017 Monte Carlo Rally was held in Monaco over four days, the first round of the 2017 World Rally Championship. Sébastien Ogier was the overall winner.

Deaths

See also 

 2017 in Europe
 City states

References 

 
2010s in Monaco
Years of the 21st century in Monaco
Monaco
Monaco